Vittadinia muelleri, commonly known as narrow-leaf New Holland daisy, is a flowering plant in the family Asteraceae. It is a small perennial forb with bright green leaves and purple daisy-like flowers.  It grows in New South Wales, Victoria, Tasmania and the Australian Capital Territory.

Description
The stems are leafy, branched or simple and covered sparsely or scattered with stiff, short, spreading hairs.

Taxonomy
Vittadinia muelleri was first formally described in 1969 Nancy Tyson Burbidge and the description was published in Proceedings of the Linnean Society of New South Wales''.

Distribution and habitat
Narrow-leaf New Holland daisy grows in dry forests, woodlands, and grasslands in Victoria, New South Wales and Tasmania.

References

Astereae
Asterales of Australia
Flora of New South Wales
Flora of Victoria (Australia)
Flora of Tasmania
Flora of the Australian Capital Territory
Plants described in 1969